The 51st annual Berlin International Film Festival was held from February 7 to 18, 2001. The festival opened with war-drama film Enemy at the Gates by Jean-Jacques Annaud. 70 mm restored version of Stanley Kubrick's 1968 Sci-fi film 2001: A Space Odyssey was the closing film of the festival. The Golden Bear was awarded to French-British film Intimacy directed by Patrice Chéreau. The retrospective dedicated to German-Austrian filmmaker, screenwriter Fritz Lang was shown at the festival.

Jury
The following people were announced as being on the jury for the festival:
 Bill Mechanic, producer (United States) - Jury President
 Jacqueline Bisset, actress (United Kingdom)
 Diego Galán, director and film critic (Spain)
 Kyoko Hirano, writer (Japan)
 Fatih Akın, director, screenwriter, producer and actor (Germany)
 Dario Argento, director, screenwriter and producer (Italy)
 Xie Fei, director and screenwriter (China)
 Héctor Babenco, director, screenwriter and producer (Brazil)
 Dominique Blanc, actress (France)

In competition
The following films were in competition for the Golden Bear and Silver Bear awards:

Key
{| class="wikitable" width="550" colspan="1"
|  style="background:#ffdead; text-align:center;"| †
|Winner of the main award for best film in its section
|-
| colspan="2"| The opening and closing films are screened during the opening and closing ceremonies respectively.
|}

Retrospective

The following films were shown in the retrospective:

Awards

The following prizes were awarded by the Jury:
 Golden Bear: Intimacy by Patrice Chéreau
 Silver Bear – Special Jury Prize: Beijing Bicycle by Wang Xiaoshuai
 Silver Bear for Best Director: Lin Cheng-sheng for Betelnut Beauty
 Silver Bear for Best Actress: Kerry Fox for Intimacy
 Silver Bear for Best Actor: Benicio del Toro for Traffic
 Silver Bear for an outstanding artistic contribution: Raúl Pérez Cubero for You're the One
 Jury Prize: Lone Scherfig for Italian for Beginners
 Alfred Bauer Prize: La Ciénaga by Lucrecia Martel
 Blue Angel Award: Intimacy by Patrice Chéreau
 Honorary Golden Bear: Kirk Douglas
 Berlinale Camera: Kei Kumai
FIPRESCI Award
Italian for Beginners by Lone Scherfig

References

External links
Berlin International Film Festival:2001 at Internet Movie Database
 Berlin International Film Festival 2001

51
2001 film festivals
2001 festivals in Europe
2001 in Berlin
2001 in German cinema